"La Canción" (stylized in upper case; English: "The Song") is a song by Colombian singer J Balvin and Puerto Rican rapper Bad Bunny. The song was released on 2 August 2019 as the second single from their collaborative album Oasis. It reached number one in Mexico and on the US Latin Songs chart.

Commercial performance
Like the rest of the songs of Oasis, "La Canción" managed to chart on the Billboard Hot Latin Songs chart, debuting at number 10. The song managed to top the Hot Latin Songs chart on the week of November 30, 2019, earning J Balvin and Bad Bunny their seventh and third number one singles on that chart, respectively. "La Canción" is the second single from Oasis to chart on the Billboard Hot 100, entering the chart at number 98 and later peaking at number 84.

Music video
The music video for "La Canción" was released on 14 October 2019 and was directed by Colin Tilley. It was filmed within a club and its plot revolves around the disparity that occurs when a relationship ends.

Covers 
In September 2022, British rock band Coldplay covered "La Canción" at their Bogotá, Colombia show of their Music of the Spheres World Tour.

Charts

Weekly charts

Year-end charts

Certifications

See also
List of Billboard number-one Latin songs of 2019

References

2019 songs
2019 singles
J Balvin songs
Bad Bunny songs
Spanish-language songs
Songs written by Bad Bunny
Songs written by J Balvin
Music videos directed by Colin Tilley